Xigua Video is a Chinese online video-sharing platform owned by ByteDance. Originally serving primarily as a sharing platform for Toutiao's user-created short videos, Xigua now also produces film and television content. As of June 2020, the platform has 131 million monthly active users.

History 
Xigua Video was initially launched as Toutiao Video in May 2016.

On June 8, 2017, Toutiao Video officially changed its name to Xigua Video and redesigned its logo. The name "Xigua" means "watermelon" and refers to the Chinese concept of "watermelon-eating crowd", meaning "onlookers who just casually enjoy their melons and watch events unfold without wanting to get involved."

On November 25, 2017, Xigua Video established a co-production fund to encourage content creation with an amount of RMB 2 billion.

In January 2018, Xigua Live went online. In the same month, Xigua Video launched the first season of online live quiz show Millionaire Heroes.

In September 2018, Xigua Video announced plans to develop film and television drama segments.

On October 20, 2020, the platform announced at an annual conference that it would invest at least RMB 2 billion to incentivize creators of "middle-form" videos in the coming year.

Partnerships 
In April 2020, Xigua Video announced a content cooperation deal with BBC Studios to jointly produce two documentaries, Hubble: The Wonders of Space Revealed and Primates, and show other BBC Studios content on Xigua. The platform also partnered with the Discovery Channel to air documentaries such as Man vs. Wild and Life After Chernobyl.

In April 2020, Moonbug Entertainment, a London-based company, announced a partnership with Xigua Video, making content from the Little Baby Bum brand available on the platform in both English and Mandarin.

References

External links 

Android (operating system) software
IOS software
Freeware
Video software
ByteDance
2016 establishments in China
Video hosting